Elections to provincial, municipal, city, county and district people's assemblies were held in North Korea on July 24, 2011.

28,116 provincial, municipal, city, county and district people's assembly deputies were elected.

Voter turnout was reported as 99.97%, with candidates receiving a 100% approval rate.

References

2011 in North Korea
2011 elections in Asia
Local elections in North Korea